Cnemaspis sundagekko is a species of gecko from Pulau Siantan, Indonesia.

References

Further reading
Amarasinghe, AA Thasun, et al. "A New Species of Cnemaspis (Reptilia: Gekkonidae) from Sumatra, Indonesia." Herpetologica 71.2 (2015): 160–167.

sundagekko
Reptiles described in 2014